Alioune Kissima Touré (born 9 September 1978) is a French former professional footballer. He is an attacking midfielder but can play both as a forward or as a winger.

Playing career
Born in Saint-Denis, Alioune started his career in 1996 with FC Nantes and signed his first professional contract in 1997. During his 7 seasons with the club, he became Ligue 1 winner in 2001 (to which he contributed 15 appearances) and twice a winner of the Coupe de France in 1999 and 2000.

Alioune Toure was then transferred to Manchester City with whom he won the Championship gaining promotion to the Premier League.

In 2002, he signed with Paris Saint-Germain on a five-year contract where he was finalist of the Coupe de France in 2003 before winning it in 2004.
 
He then played for the Portuguese club União de Leiria between 2005 and 2007 and in Qatar for Dubai CSC in 2008. Back in Europe in 2009, he pursued his career at the Olympiakos Nicosia in Cyprus. After a brief time playing for Paris FC in 2010, he ended his professional footballer's career in 2011.

Managerial career
Then, in 2012 Alioune joined the first league Chinese club Shanghai Shenhua as a coach assistant. In 2013, he pursued his coach training while supervising and detecting young talents in Africa. Finally, he obtained his UEFA A Coaching Licence from the French Football Federation in 2015.

Honours

Club
Nantes
 Ligue 1: 2000–01
 Coupe de France: 1998–99, 1999–2000
 Trophée des Champions: 1999, 2001

Manchester City
 Football League Championship: 2001–02

Paris Saint-Germain
 Coupe de France: 2004

International
France
 UEFA U19 Football Championship: 1997

References

External links
Career history at Voetbal International

1978 births
Living people
French footballers
France youth international footballers
French expatriate footballers
Expatriate footballers in England
Expatriate footballers in Portugal
Expatriate footballers in Cyprus
Ligue 1 players
Ligue 2 players
FC Nantes players
Manchester City F.C. players
Paris Saint-Germain F.C. players
En Avant Guingamp players
U.D. Leiria players
French people of Malian descent
French sportspeople of Senegalese descent
Olympiakos Nicosia players
Paris FC players
Association football forwards
Cypriot Second Division players